Banksia idiogenes is a species of tufted shrub that is endemic to Western Australia. It has hairy stems, deeply pinnatifid leaves, distinctive, scented, red and white flowers in heads of about eighty, later several glabrous, egg-shaped follicles in each head.

Description
The flowers are strongly scented and arranged in groups of about eighty in a head on the ends of branches, often the heads close together.

Taxonomy
This species was first formally described by Alex George in 1996 in the journal Nuytsia and given the name Dryandra idiogenes, from material he collected near Newdegate in 1986. The specific epithet (idiogenes) is an ancient Greek word meaning "distinctive" or "peculiar", in reference to this species' unusual bracts and strongly scented red and white flowers.

In 2007, Austin Mast and Kevin Thiele transferred all the dryandras to the genus Banksia and this species became Banksia idiogenes.

Distribution and habitat
Banksia idiogenes grows in kwongan and is only known from several small populations in a small area near Newdegate in the Mallee biogeographic region.

Conservation status
This banksia is classified as "Priority Two" by the Western Australian Government Department of Parks and Wildlife meaning that it is poorly known and from only one or a few locations.

References

idiogenes
Endemic flora of Western Australia
Plants described in 1996
Taxa named by Alex George
Taxa named by Kevin Thiele